Przyczyna Dolna  (German: Nieder Pritschen) is a village in the administrative district of Gmina Wschowa, within Wschowa County, Lubusz Voivodeship, in western Poland.

References

Przyczyna Dolna